Gary Scott Thompson (born October 7, 1959) is an American screenwriter, television producer, and director. Scott is notable for his work on The Fast and the Furious starring Vin Diesel and Paul Walker, the sequel 2 Fast 2 Furious, Hollow Man with Kevin Bacon and Elisabeth Shue, Split Second, 88 Minutes, starring Al Pacino, and K-911 and K-9: P.I..

As creator, showrunner, writer, and executive producer of NBC's hit series Las Vegas,  Thompson also directed 4 episodes and made a brief appearance as a psychotherapy patient. Thompson wrote, co-developed, and executive produced NBC and TF1's Taxi Brooklyn.

Life and career
Born in Ukiah, California, but spending much of his childhood in American Samoa, Thompson first gained exposure to the world of entertainment as an
actor, studying the craft from such actors as Powers Boothe. To pay for his education and support himself, Thompson worked in a junkyard, operated heavy equipment, delivered mail, built sets for a theatre company, tutored college students in English, taught high school in New York City, worked in a gym, was a stagehand at the Metropolitan Opera House NYC, was a reader and assistant dramaturgy at Circle Rep Theatre, and did story notes and development for a Hollywood film studio and distributor.

Eventually settling on writing, he received a Master of Fine Arts degree from New York University and went to work as a playwright. Thompson's theater credits include "Small Town Syndrome," "Cowboys Don't Cry" and "Private Hells." 
Thompson resides in Los Angeles with his wife and two children.

Awards
For Las Vegas, Thompson received the honor of Best Drama Series at the WIN Awards, an awards show dedicated to highlighting positive and multi-dimensional portrayals of women in media. Additionally, Thompson received the first-ever Visionary Award from spinal cord injury advocacy organization Life Rolls On for the first-ever portrayal of a featured character with a SCI on national television.

Filmography

Films 

Thompson has a "Based on characters created by" credit in The Fast & Furious films and series in which he did not participate.

Television

References

External links

Tisch Dramatic Writing Alumni

1959 births
Living people
Television producers from California
Tisch School of the Arts alumni
American Samoan screenwriters
American male writers
American male screenwriters
American television writers
People from Ukiah, California
Showrunners